Félicien Kabuga (born 1 March 1933) is a génocidaire and Rwandan businessman who played a major role in the run-up to the Genocide of the Rwandan Tutsis. A multimillionaire, he was closely connected to dictator Juvénal Habyarimana's Hutu nationalist MRND party and the Akazu, an informal group of Hutu extremists who helped lead the Rwandan genocide.

Kabuga is noted for his role as the primary financier of Hutu extremist media outlets, such as the RTLM radio station and Kangura magazine, which advocated for the killing of the Tutsi minority. Kabuga helped fund the mass importation of 500,000 machetes in preparation for genocide between January 1993 to March 1994.

In 2020, Kabuga was arrested by the French police in Greater Paris at the age of 87 after 26 years as a fugitive. He is currently in custody of the IRMCT branch in The Hague and is awaiting trial for crimes against humanity.

Early life
Kabuga was born in Munig, in the commune of Mukarange, prefecture of Byumba, present-day Rwanda. Kabuga amassed his wealth by owning tea farms in northern Rwanda, among other business ventures.

In 1993, at an RTLM fundraising meeting organised by the MRND, Félicien Kabuga allegedly publicly defined the purpose of RTLM as the defence of Hutu Power. During the ICTR's so-called "media trial", former RTLM presenter Georges Ruggiu named Kabuga as the "Chairman Director-general" of the station, with duties such as "presiding over RTLM" and "representing RTLM."

From January 1993 to March 1994, a total of 500,000 machetes were imported into Rwanda, statistically one for every three adult Hutus in the country. Kabuga has been named as one of the main importers of these machetes.

Indictment by ICTR
On 29 August 1998, the prosecutor of the United Nations International Criminal Tribunal for Rwanda, Carla Del Ponte, indicted Kabuga. In the amended indictment dated 1 October 2004, prosecutor Hassan Jallow charged Kabuga with:
 Conspiracy to commit genocide
 Genocide, or alternatively
 Complicity in genocide
 Direct and public incitement to commit genocide
 Extermination as a crime against humanity.

Life as a fugitive
Kabuga fled Rwanda in 1994 as it was being conquered by the Rwandan Patriotic Front. He first attempted to enter Switzerland, but was ordered to leave. He went to Kinshasa in the Democratic Republic of the Congo and was later believed to be residing in Nairobi, Kenya.

In September 1995, before any indictment and before he was named as a suspected planner of the genocide, Kabuga registered and ran a business, Nshikabem Agency, in Nairobi.

In 2003, a young Kenyan journalist helping American agents from the Federal Bureau of Investigation track down Kabuga was murdered.

In a speech given on 28 August 2006 during his visit to Kenya, then-US Senator Barack Obama accused Kenya of "allowing [Kabuga] to purchase safe haven." The Kenyan government called the allegation "an insult to the people of this country."

According to June 2008 reports by a Norwegian-based blogger calling himself African Press International (API), Kabuga was in hiding in Oslo, and might be seeking to turn himself in. Authorities dismissed this claim as a hoax.

The United States State Department offered a reward of $5 million for information leading to Kabuga's arrest. On June 14, 2008, Kenya's KTN News Network reported that Kabuga had been arrested the day before and was being held at Gigiri Police Station in Nairobi. Later the suspect was found to be a local university lecturer, not Kabuga, and released. It was earlier suspected that Kabuga resided in Kenya and was to be running businesses and enjoying protection from either the Kenyan government or some influential figures within the country.

Arrest
On 16 May 2020, police arrested Kabuga, now aged 87, in Asnières-sur-Seine, near Paris, France; he had spent 26 years as a fugitive. French authorities have expressed desire to see him tried for crimes against humanity committed against the Tutsis of Rwanda. He was arrested by French police as the result of a joint investigation with the IRMCT Office of the Prosecutor, assisted by Interpol and law enforcement agencies in Rwanda, Belgium, and the United States. On 27 May, Kabuga denied the charges, but was denied bail.

On 3 June and then on 30 September 2020, French justice system approved the handover of Kabuga to the IRMCT. On 26 October 2020, he was transferred from France to the custody of the IRMCT branch in The Hague. He has pleaded not guilty.

In March 2023, Kabuga's trial was suspended to assess claims by his attorneys that he suffers from dementia and is not mentally competent to stand trial. The court announced that it had received an independent medical report regarding Kabuga's mental fitness and would be holding further hearings over the coming weeks.

Personal life
Kabuga is married to Josephine Mukazitoni and has 11 children. Two of his daughters are married to two of Juvénal Habyarimana's sons.

Notes

References

External links
ICTR page for Kabuga's case (ICTR-98-44B), including indictment
TRIAL International: Félicien Kabuga 
U.S. State Department press release about Kabuga
U.S. State Department International Crime Alert about Kabuga
Profile of Kabuga from Rewardsforjustice.net
Genocide: Kabuga's Kenyan 'Friends', The East African, 17 June 2002

1933 births
20th-century Rwandan businesspeople
Fugitives
Hutu people
Living people
People from Northern Province, Rwanda
Rwandan genocide perpetrators